Andrzej Hanisz (born 3 February 1962) is a Polish former ice hockey goaltender. He is currently serving as a goaltender coach in Germany.

Hanisz was a member of the Poland men's national ice hockey team which competed at the 1988 Winter Olympics held in Calgary, Alberta, Canada. He was also a member of the Polish national team that competed at the 1992 Men's World Ice Hockey Championships held in Czechoslovakia.

References

External links

Living people
1962 births
Ice hockey players at the 1988 Winter Olympics
Olympic ice hockey players of Poland
Polish ice hockey goaltenders
Sportspeople from Katowice
20th-century Polish people